was a feudal domain under the Tokugawa shogunate of Edo period Japan, located in Shimōsa Province (modern-day Chiba Prefecture), Japan. It was centered on Sakura Castle in what is now the city of Sakura, Chiba. It was ruled for most of its history by the Hotta clan.

History
Sakura Domain was originally created for Takeda Tadateru, the fifth son of Tokugawa Ieyasu in 1593, near the site of an ancient castle of the Chiba clan, which had fallen into ruins in the early Sengoku period. The domain subsequently passed through a bewildering number of hands during the 1600s, before coming under the control of the Hotta clan in the mid-18th century. During the Bakumatsu period, Hotta Masayoshi was one of the major proponents of rangaku and an ending to the country’s national isolation policy. He was one of the signers of the Treaty of Amity and Commerce with the United States. His son, Hotta Masatomo was a key supporter of the Tokugawa shogunate in the early stages of the Boshin War. After the Meiji Restoration, he was pardoned, and eventually made a count (hakushaku) in the kazoku peerage.

Holdings at the end of the Edo period
As with most domains in the han system, Sakura Domain consisted of several discontinuous territories calculated to provide the assigned kokudaka, based on periodic cadastral surveys and projected agricultural yields. 

Shimōsa Province
31 villages in Chiba District
146 villages in Imba District
 26 villages in Shimohabu District
3 villages in Katori District
3 villages in Sōsa District
2 villages in Kaijō District
8 villages in Sōma District
Dewa Province (Uzen)
45 villages in Murayama District
Hitachi Province
3 villages in Tsukuba District
3 villages in Makabe District
Shimotsuke Province
16 villages in Tsuga District 
10 villages in Shioya District
Musashi Province
 3 villages in Saitama District
1 village in Koma District
2 villages in Iruma District
14 villages in Yokomi District
Sagami Province
5 villages in Kōza District
10 villages in Ōsumi District
2 villages in Aiko District

List of daimyō

References

Bolitho, Harold (1974). Treasures among men; the fudai daimyo in Tokugawa Japan. New Haven: Yale University Press.
Kodama Kōta 児玉幸多, Kitajima Masamoto 北島正元 (1966). Kantō no shohan 関東の諸藩. Tokyo: Shin Jinbutsu Ōraisha.

External links
 Genealogy of the lords of Sakura

Notes

Domains of Japan
1593 establishments in Japan
States and territories established in 1593
1871 disestablishments in Japan
States and territories disestablished in 1871
Shimōsa Province
History of Chiba Prefecture
Hotta clan
Inaba clan
Matsudaira clan
Nagasawa-Matsudaira clan
Ogasawara clan
Ogyū-Matsudaira clan
Ōkubo clan
Takeda clan